Lucy Honig (May 7, 1948 - September 18, 2017) was an American short story writer.

Life
She graduated from Syracuse University and from Hunter College with a master's in education.  She taught in the Boston University School of Public Health .

Her work appeared in AGNI, DoubleTake, Gargoyle, The Gettysburg Review, Ploughshares

Awards
 1998 Drue Heinz Literature Prize
 1992, 1996 O. Henry Award for short fiction
 L.L. Winship PEN New England award finalist

Works

Short Stories

  (reprint 2002)

Novels

Anthologies
 Best American Short Stories 1988,

References

External links
"THE TRULY NEEDY: And Other Stories.", The New York Times, GARDNER McFALL, February 6, 2000

1948 births
Living people
American short story writers
Syracuse University alumni
Hunter College alumni
Boston University School of Public Health faculty